Mecyna luscitialis is a moth in the family Crambidae. It was described by William Barnes and James Halliday McDunnough in 1914. It is found in North America, where it has been recorded from Arizona, California and Nevada.

References

Moths described in 1914
Spilomelinae